Wang Tiexin (born 24 February 1989) is a Chinese rower. He competed in the men's lightweight coxless four event at the 2012 and 2016 Summer Olympics. He won the bronze medal at the 2014 World Rowing Championships in the men's lightweight four with Li Hui, Tian Bin and Dong Tianfeng.

References

1989 births
Living people
Chinese male rowers
Olympic rowers of China
Rowers at the 2012 Summer Olympics
Rowers at the 2016 Summer Olympics
Asian Games medalists in rowing
Rowers at the 2014 Asian Games
Asian Games gold medalists for China
Medalists at the 2014 Asian Games
World Rowing Championships medalists for China
Rowers from Zhejiang
People from Huzhou
20th-century Chinese people
21st-century Chinese people